Komanduri Ramachary is an Indian playback singer, music composer and Music Teacher who predominantly works in Telugu films. Ramachary was born in Medak District, Telangana and brought up in Hyderabad, Telangana. His first film as music director was PremaLekha Raasa. SP Balasubramanyam, a renowned playback singer in Telugu, Tamil, Kannada, Malayalam and Hindi cinema has been a guide and inspiration. His songs are for the movies Sambaram, Ramayanam, Sri Ramadasu

Performed all over India & Abroad in countries, including America,  Australia, Kuwait & Dubai. He has won many Awards like Andhra Pradesh State government NANDI Award, Delhi Telugu Academy Award, Vamsee International Award, and Kalaradhana Award.

Early life and background
Ramachary was born to Komanduri Krishnamachary and Yashodamma in Medak District of Telangana. Ramachary's musical journey started at a very young age when he used to accompany his father, a Harikatha artist, for his concerts in various villages. Blessed with a mellifluous voice which is smooth as silk, he learnt Carnatic classical music from Kumari. Oruganti Leelavathi garu and light music from Shri P.V.Sai Baba Garu.

He struggled hard to complete training in music as well as graduation. He also completed his B.Ed from Osmania University. Through these years, he won many accolades for his rendition of devotional songs and light music in Radio and T V shows.

Occupation highlights
He has been a Mentor for many reality shows on various T.V channels. He is a Founder of  Little Musicians Academy, established in the year 1998 imparting free training, guiding & promoting talented children and youngsters in music (free of cost) with the motto of peace and international brotherhood through music. Under the mentorship, coaching and able guidance of Ramachary, LMA Recognises talent, provide training in light music (Film songs, geet, ghazals, group songs, patriotic songs etc.), light classical music (Annamacharya, Purandharadas and Ramadasa keertanalu etc.). It provides nuances and techniques of singing like breath management, voice modulation, emoting etc. while keeping shruthi and laya in mind. Students also learn techniques like body language, holding mikes, voice throwing etc. through real time exposure to stage and recording studios. So far LMA trained over 3000 children. Most of the students of LMA have become professional playback singers and channel stars. Students of LMA are moulded into wonderful human beings.

Future endeavors
With the support of all music lovers he wishes to establish a residential music school for musically talented children among orphans & socially discriminated and to establish an Old Age home for senior musicians. He wants to spread peace, international brotherhood, humanity & social awareness through music.

Personal life
Ramachary is married to Sujatha Dhawala and blessed with a Son Saketh and daughter Sahithi (Sony)

References

1965 births
Living people
Indian male playback singers
Indian film score composers
Singers from Hyderabad, India
Telugu playback singers
20th-century Indian singers
Indian male film score composers
20th-century Indian male singers